Rev. Donald Macfarlane (1834–1926) was the founding father of the Free Presbyterian Church of Scotland. It began as a separate denomination when he tabled a Protest against the Declaratory Act at 25 May 1893 meeting of the General Assembly of the Free Church of Scotland (1843–1900). 
The Act, originally passed in 1892, had allowed a watering-down of the Calvinism of the church and conservative Free Churchmen like Macfarlane believed it would prevent church discipline of those who opposed the Westminster Confession of Faith as a result of it. Macfarlane and those who followed him believed that it 'altered and vitiated' the constitution of the Free Church. On 28 July 1893, at a meeting in Portree, Isle of Skye, Macfarlane joined the Rev Donald Macdonald, Shieldaig and Alexander Macfarlane, a schoolmaster on Raasay, in forming a presbytery. 
Macfarlane was minister of the Free Church in Strathconon, Ross-shire (1873–1879), followed by Moy, Inverness-shire (1879–1889) and Kilmallie (1889–1893). As a Free Presbyterian minister he served in Raasay until 1903 when he was translated to the Dingwall congregation which he pastored until his death in 1926.

References

Citations

Sources

Ministers of the Free Presbyterian Church of Scotland
1834 births
1926 deaths